Volodymyr Vasylyovych Demchyshyn is a former Ukrainian banker and politician and a Minister of Energy and Coal Industry of Ukraine (2014-2016) in the second Yatsenyuk Government.

Biography 
Demchyshyn studied international economic relations at Lviv University and received MBA in international finance at the University of Kansas Business School.

In 2003 Demchyshyn started his career financial institutions and he has held top positions in the Kyiv branches of ING Bank and Ernst & Young. Prior to his post of Minister of Energy and Coal Industry of Ukraine he was Director of the investment company Investment Capital Ukraine.

Due to the factsheet of the Bank Avangard he is one of the co-owners of the ICU/Bank Avangard-complex (whose former director was the actual governor of the National Bank of Ukraine, Valeriya Hontareva).

In December, 2014 Demchyshyn was appointed as the Minister of Energy and Coal Industry of Ukraine. He served as minister until May 2016.

In May 2016, he was appointed as a member of the Supervisory Board of Naftogaz. He was resigned in September 2019.

References 

 	 

Living people
1974 births
Businesspeople from Lviv
University of Lviv alumni
Ukrainian bankers
Energy and coal industry ministers of Ukraine
Fuel and energy ministers of Ukraine
Politicians from Lviv